A cusper is a person born near the end of one generation and the beginning of another. People born in these circumstances tend to have a mix of characteristics common to their adjacent generations, but do not closely resemble those born in the middle of their adjacent generations. Generational profiles are built based on people born in the middle of a generation rather than those on the tails of a generation. Generations may overlap by five to eight years. As such, many people identify with aspects of at least two generations. The precise birth years defining when generations start and end vary.

Notable cusper groups

Greatest Generation/Silent Generation

Date ranges

Just before the 1920s, as identified by Graeme Codrington

Characteristics
These cuspers experienced the lows after World War I but also the highs of the early Roaring Twenties, the Flappers, the Charleston and early silent films. As these cuspers came of age, some of them become more visionary like the Greatest Generation or stoic like the Silents.

Silent Generation/Baby Boomers

Date ranges

1933–1945 as identified by Susan Mitchell
1939–1945 as identified by Claire Raines Associates
1940–1945 as identified by Lynne Lancaster and David Stillman, authors of When Generations Collide, as well as The Mayo Clinic
1943–1948 as identified by Deon Smit, writing for HR Future

Characteristics
Claire Raines Associates names these cuspers the Sandwich Group, Susan Mitchell calls these cuspers the Swing Generation, and Smit calls them Troomers. According to the Mayo Clinic, these cuspers have the work ethic of the Silent Generations, but like Baby Boomers will often challenge the status quo. Codrington describes them as having the status-seeking, career advancement motivations as Baby Boomers. Codrington adds that they are old enough to remember World War II, but were born too late to enjoy the 1960s. Hart notes that research has found the younger members of the Silent Generation tended to share more traits with Baby Boomers. Writer Marian Botsford Fraser described women in this cusper population as girls who "...did not smoke dope at high school, go to rock concerts, toy with acid and the pill and hippie boyfriends at university or tour Europe with a backpack." Instead, she notes "These girls wore crinolines and girdles, went to The Prom, went to nursing school and teachers' college, rarely university." Speaking of Susan Mitchell's population specifically they are believed to be an anomaly in that they tend be more activist and free thinkers than those born prior to them in the Silent Generation. Lancaster and Stillman echo this last point and note that these cuspers were on the frontlines of America's internal struggles as adults, agitating in favor of human rights. They go on to say many women among these cuspers entered in to male-dominated workplaces before the women's movement existed, blazing a trail for other generations of women to follow.

Baby Boomers/Generation X

Date ranges

1954–1965 as identified by Jonathan Pontell
1955–1960 as identified by Mary E. Donahue
1958–1967 as identified by Mark Wegierski of the Hudson Institute
1960–1965 as identified by Lancaster and Stillman, Mayo Clinic, and Andrea Stone writing in USA Today
1962–1967 as identified by Smit
1964–1969 as identified by Codrington

Characteristics
This population is sometimes referred to as Generation Jones, and less commonly as Tweeners & as Baby X’s by Smit. These cuspers were not as financially successful as older Baby Boomers. They experienced a recession like many Generation Xers but had a much more difficult time finding jobs than Generation X did. While they learned to be IT-savvy, they didn't have computers until after high school but were some of the first to purchase them for their homes. They were among some of the first to take an interest in video games. They get along well with Baby Boomers, but share different values. While they are comfortable in office environments, they are more relaxed at home. They're less interested in advancing their careers than Baby Boomers and more interested in quality of life.

Generation X/Millennials

Date ranges

 1975–1980 as identified by Donahue, as well as The Mayo Clinic
 1976–1982 as identified by Hannah L. Ubl, Lisa X. Walden, and Debra Arbit
 1977–1981 as identified by Doree Shafrir, writing for Slate
 1977–1983 as identified by Smit and Merriam-Webster
 1977–1985 as identified by Business Insider

Characteristics
The Generation X/Millennial cuspers are most commonly referred to as Xennials, although other names include the Oregon Trail Generation, Generation Catalano and The Lucky Ones. Researchers point out that these cuspers have both the healthy skepticism of Generation X and the optimism of Millennials. They are likely to challenge authority, but also are more career-focused than Generation X. While not all of these cuspers are digital natives, they are very comfortable with technology.

Millennials/Generation Z

Date ranges

 1990–2000 as identified by Avery Hartmans, writing for Business Insider USA  
 1992–1998 as identified by Ubl, Walden, and Arbit, WGSN, Vogue, Mary Everett, writing for PopSugar
 1992–2000 as identified by Ketchum
 1993–1998 as identified by Smit, Maisy Farren, writing for Vice, Lindsay Dogson, writing for Business Insider Mexico, and Metlife
 1993–1999 as identified by Fullscreen, LLC
 1995–2000 as identified by Donahue

Characteristics
Names given for these cuspers include the Snapchat Generation by Ubl, Walden, and Arbit, MinionZ by Smit, Zillennials, and Zennials. They are characterized as being "raised less by optimistic Boomers and more by skeptical Xers and pragmatic Gen Jonesers, who raised them to focus more on the practical rather than the aspirational."

Workplace importance 
Communication misunderstandings between employees of different generations are detrimental to workplace morale, increasing turnover and absenteeism while decreasing job satisfaction, work commitment and productivity. Effective communication between employees of different generations, however, allows for collaborative relationships and ensures that information is retained from one generation to the next. Cuspers play an important role in multi-generational workplaces and other organizations. Metaphorically, cuspers are like bridges or glue that connect members of their adjacent major generations. Between generations, they are naturally skilled at mediating, translating, mentoring and managing. Strategically placing cuspers in the workplace has the potential to reduce generational workplace friction and give organizations doing so a competitive advantage.

Generational identity 
Many cuspers don't feel a sense of belonging to a specific generation. Researchers studying generational subculture theory have speculated that there may be populations within larger generational cohorts whose values are more in line with those of preceding generations, for example, someone born in the range of Generation X who has a moral philosophy more similar to the Silent Generation. The generational fuzziness theory proposes that one's generation is best defined as the combination of one's birth year and generational identity—the cultural generation to feel most similar to.

References

Cultural generations
Demographics